Ripsipiirakka was a Finnish punk rock band, known for its vulgar lyrics. The most popular songs are Sanni and a cover version from Pekka Ruuska's Rafaelin enkeli.

Members
Jukka (born 9 October 1983), Vocals and Guitar
Hannu (born 28 February 1983), Bass
Mika (born 19 June 1985), Drums
Olli (born 5 May 1983), Vocals and Guitar

Discography

Albums
Punkstars (31 January 2003)
Teille vai meille (22 January 2004)
The Ripsipiirakka Show (27 April 2005)

EP's
Ota Mut (24 September 2003)

Singles
Uudestaan
Kolmistaan (15 November 2002)

Finnish punk rock groups